Ochthephilum is a genus of rove beetles in the subfamily Paederinae.

References

External links 
 
 
 
 Ochthephilum at insectoid.info

Staphylinidae genera
Paederinae